Karen Jobling (born 13 April 1962) is an English former cricketer who played primarily as a bowler. She appeared in 1 Test match and 2 One Day Internationals for England, and 8 ODIs for International XI at the 1982 World Cup. She played domestic cricket for Yorkshire.

References

External links
 

England women Test cricketers
England women One Day International cricketers
International XI women One Day International cricketers
Living people
1962 births
Yorkshire women cricketers